John Pogue Stewart (June 1, 1876 – January 27, 1922) was an American football and basketball coach.  He was the fifth head football coach at Illinois State University in Normal, Illinois, serving for four seasons, from 1903 to 1906, compiling are record of 14–11–1.

Stewart taught sciences including biology and physics at Illinois high schools before and during his time at Illinois State. He also studied horticulture at Cornell University, receiving his A.B. in 1902.

Stewart was later a professor at Pennsylvania State University as well as a fruit grower, botanist and horticulturist. He died at his York, Pennsylvania home in 1922. At the time of his death, he was the head of the department of pomology at Penn State.

References

1876 births
1922 deaths
Basketball coaches from Illinois
Illinois State Redbirds football coaches
Illinois State Redbirds men's basketball coaches
Cornell University alumni
Illinois State University alumni
Pennsylvania State University faculty
University of Illinois alumni
People from Henderson County, Illinois